Konstantin "Samokovetsa" Dimitrov (November 21, 1970 – December 6, 2003) was a famous Bulgarian mobster.

Background 
Konstantin Dimitrov was born in Samokov, Bulgaria. He was married with Angelina Dimitrova. They had one son together, Konstantin Dimitrov Jr.

Career 
At 16, he was employed as a security guard at Rila hotel in Borovets, Bulgaria. He graduated with a degree in Public Administration from the National and World Economy University. According to his interviews in Bulgarian media, he dealt with trade, consultancy, import, restaurants, and farming. He also owned several firms, and properties in Great Britain . He owned a hotel, several apartments and houses in the Bulgarian resorts of Borovets and Bistritsa. He was one of the most influential businessman in the Balkans. In 1997, he was a consultant for VIS, and in 2003 he was a consultant for Bulgarian and Cypriot companies trading with Turkey.

Death 
On December 6, 2003 Dimitrov was shot dead on Dam Square in Amsterdam.

References 
Official business of Konstantin Dimitrov
Grigor Lilov,Secrets of big players
Bulgarian Underworld Boss Shot dead in Amsterdam

External links
Bulgarian Boss Shot Dead (Italian)
Gangsters at war?
Russian Mafia 

1970 births
2003 deaths
Bulgarian gangsters
People from Samokov
Murdered Bulgarian gangsters
Bulgarian people murdered abroad
People murdered in the Netherlands
Filmed assassinations
Dam Square